Malhar may refer to:

 Malhar (raga), a musical raga
 Malhar, Chhattisgarh, a town in India
 Malhar (festival), a college festival of St. Xavier's College, Mumbai, India
 Malhargad ("Malhar Fort"), a hill fort in Maharashtra, India

People

 Malhar Pandya, Indian actor
 Malhar Patel, Kenyan cricketer
 Malhar Rao Holkar, a noble of the Maratha Empire of India, founder of the dynasty that ruled the Indore State
 Malhar Rao Holkar II, a ruler of the Indore State of present-day India
 Malhar Rao Gaekwad, a ruler of the Baroda State of present-day India
 Malhar Thakar, Indian actor